The Amazing Brentwood (previously Brentwood Town Centre and also referred to as Brentwood Mall) is a shopping mall in Burnaby, British Columbia, Canada.

History

The Brentwood Park neighbourhood was developed in the early 1950s with 572 homes and plans for a shopping centre. The site was pieced together from municipal property and 14 private owners and acquired by Webb and Knapp Canada in 1957; several retailers had already purchased properties on the site and agreed to an integrated mall plan. Plans for the shopping centre were formally announced in January 1959 and approved by the municipal council the following month. Construction on the $10 million project began later that year.

The Brentwood Shopping Centre opened on August 16, 1961, with 10,000 visitors on the first day causing traffic congestion on the Lougheed Highway. Its anchors included Eaton's, Loblaws (their first store in British Columbia), and Zellers; other stores were spread between an enclosed area and outdoor strip mall.

The outdoor portion was later converted to an enclosed space, while a second level was added in the 1980s.

Redevelopment
In November 2014, the  Brentwood Town Centre site underwent a major redevelopment as part of a development initiative entitled "The Amazing Brentwood", which aims to create a master-planned neighbourhood.

Transportation
Brentwood Town Centre is directly connected to Brentwood Town Centre station on the Millennium Line of Metro Vancouver's SkyTrain rapid transit system.

References

External links
 The Amazing Brentwood official site

Shopping malls in Metro Vancouver
Shopping malls established in 1961
Buildings and structures in Burnaby
Tourist attractions in Burnaby
1961 establishments in British Columbia